Leptotes bicolor is a species of orchid native to Paraguay and southern Brazil. It is the type species of the genus Leptotes.
Its flowers and fruits are used as a substitute for vanilla in milk and ice cream.

It grows in cooler climates than vanilla, as its distribution occupies regions more distant from the equator. It contains vanillin, the main compound of the extract of the vanilla. It is grown as an ornamental plant.

Description
Leptotes bicolor is a miniature sized epiphyte. The pseudobulbs are terete and the fragrant flowers are borne in groups of 1-3 and are mostly white with a prominent purple patch on the  labellum.

References

 Cattleya Source: Leptotes bicolor
 Orchid Plant Care: Orchids in Economic Botany

bicolor
Orchids of Brazil
Flora of Paraguay
Spices
Garden plants
Crops originating from the Americas
Crops originating from Brazil
Crops originating from Paraguay
Plants described in 1833